Antoaneta Strumenlieva (born 26 June 1968) is a Bulgarian swimmer. She competed in three events at the 1988 Summer Olympics.

References

1968 births
Living people
Bulgarian female swimmers
Olympic swimmers of Bulgaria
Swimmers at the 1988 Summer Olympics
Sportspeople from Plovdiv